is a Japanese football player.

Club career
Morishima was born in Kobe on 18 September 1987. After graduating from high school, he joined Cerezo Osaka in 2006. Although he played many matches in 2007, his opportunity to play decreased in 2008 and he moved to Oita Trinita in July 2008. Although the club was relegated to J2 League from 2010, his opportunity to play increased form 2010. The club was returned to J1 League in 2013. However the club was relegated to J2 in a season and he moved to Kawasaki Frontale in 2014. However he could hardly play in the match and he moved to Júbilo Iwata in 2015. However he could not play many matches behind Jay Bothroyd and he left the club end of 2016 season. He signed with Regional Leagues club Tegevajaro Miyazaki in 2017. The club was promoted to Japan Football League end of the season. He moved to Regional Leagues club Tochigi Uva FC in 2018.

National team career
In July 2007, he was elected Japan U-20 national team for 2007 U-20 World Cup. At this tournament, he played 3 matches and scored 2 goals.

Club statistics
.

1Includes Emperor's Cup.
2Includes J. League Cup.
3Includes Pan-Pacific Championship and Promotion Playoff to J1.

National team statistics

Appearances in major competitions

Honours

Club
Oita Trinita
J.League Cup (1) : 2008

References

External links

Profile at Júbilo Iwata
Profile at Kawasaki Frontale

1987 births
Living people
Association football people from Hyōgo Prefecture
Japanese footballers
Japan youth international footballers
J1 League players
J2 League players
J3 League players
Japan Football League players
Cerezo Osaka players
Oita Trinita players
Kawasaki Frontale players
Júbilo Iwata players
Tegevajaro Miyazaki players
Tochigi City FC players
Fujieda MYFC players
Association football forwards